The 2015–16 Eastern Counties Football League season (known as the 2015–16 Thurlow Nunn Eastern Counties Football League for sponsorship reasons) was the 74th in the history of Eastern Counties Football League, a football competition in England.

Premier Division

The Premier Division featured 17 clubs which competed in the division last season, along with three new clubs, promoted from the Division One:
Long Melford
Saffron Walden Town
Swaffham Town

The following five clubs applied for promotion to Step 4: Godmanchester Rovers, Ipswich Wanderers, Mildenhall Town, Norwich United and Stanway Rovers.

League table

Results

Stadia and Locations

Division One

Division One featured 16 clubs which competed in the division last season, along with three new clubs, relegated from Premier Division:
Diss Town
Ely City
Wivenhoe Town

League table

Results

Stadia and Locations

References

External links
 Eastern Counties Football League

Eastern Counties Football League seasons
9